The following is a list of acting credits for American character actor and activist James Cromwell.

With nearly 200 acting credits to his name, Cromwell has starred in Babe (1995), Star Trek: First Contact (1996), L.A. Confidential (1997), The Green Mile (1999), Space Cowboys (2000), The Sum of All Fears (2002), I, Robot (2004), and The Artist (2011), as well as the television series Six Feet Under (2003–05), 24 (2007), American Horror Story: Asylum (2012), and Halt and Catch Fire (2015).

Cromwell has been nominated for four Emmy Awards and four Screen Actors Guild Awards, as well as the Academy Award for Best Supporting Actor for Babe. In 2013, he won the Canadian Screen Award for Best Actor for his role in Still Mine and the Primetime Emmy Award for Outstanding Supporting Actor in a Limited Series or Movie for his role in American Horror Story: Asylum.

Film

Television

Television series

Television films

Stage

References

External links

See also
List of awards and nominations received by James Cromwell

Male actor filmographies
American filmographies